Pacific Fighters, known in Russia as Pearl Harbor (Перл-Харбор), is a World War II Combat flight simulation game for Microsoft Windows, developed in Russia by 1C:Maddox Games and distributed by Ubisoft in 2004. It is in fact a stand-alone expansion pack of IL-2 Sturmovik, released three years earlier in 2001, also developed by 1C:Maddox Games and distributed by Ubisoft. The latest version corresponds to the IL-2 Sturmovik: 1946 compilation, distributed by Ubisoft in 2006.

Pacific Fighters is played online by gamers (Online fighter squadron communities) using a standard IP address or a client server such as Hyperlobby regularly but can be flown offline as well. The game gives the player 74 flyable aircraft, including variants. It was created by Maddox Games, as a Pacific War expansion of IL-2 Sturmovik: Forgotten Battles, although it can also be installed as a stand-alone game. It has two types of missions that can be flown, "dogfights" or "cooperative campaign" modes. In either type, the player can play as either Allied or Axis forces, and the type of aircraft flown usually depends on the mission picked. The game also features a mission editor, allowing the player to make their own missions.

Reception

Pacific Fighters was met with positive reception upon release, as GameRankings gave it a score of 78.35%, while Metacritic gave it 76 out of 100.

References

External links
IL-2 Sturmovik official website
 

2004 video games
1C Company games
World War II flight simulation video games
Windows games
Windows-only games
Video games developed in Russia
Video games set in Oceania
Ubisoft games
Pacific War video games